Prayer for the Assassin is an extended play by underground rapper, Vinnie Paz (of Jedi Mind Tricks). The EP contained 4 remixed tracks from Season of the Assassin and a music video for the track "Keep Movin' On". It was only available for digital download and was released four months after his debut album on October 26, 2010.

Track listing

References

External links
Official website
Prayer for the Assassin on Discogs

Hip hop EPs
2010 EPs
Vinnie Paz albums